The following are the national records in track cycling in Indonesia, maintained by its national cycling federation, Indonesian Cycling Federation.

Men

Women

References

Indonesia
records
track cycling
track cycling